Íñigo Cervantes was the defending champion but chose not to defend his title.

Jan Šátral won the title after defeating Marco Trungelliti 6–2, 6–4 in the final.

Seeds

Draw

Finals

Top half

Bottom half

References
 Main Draw
 Qualifying Draw

Marburg Open - Singles
2016 Singles